HMS Obedient was a Repeat  which served with the Royal Navy during the First World War. The M class were an improvement on the preceding , capable of higher speed. Launched in 1916, the destroyer served with the Grand Fleet during the Battle of Jutland in 1916, helping sink the torpedo boat  and narrowiy missing the German battleships as they withdrew. Subsequently, Obedient took part in anti-submarine patrols, attacking  in 1917. The conditions of service meant that the destroyer was soon worn out and, after the armistice that ended the war in 1918, Obedient was placed in reserve. Despite a service life of only five years, the vessel was decommissioned and, in 1921, sold to be broken up.

Design and development
Obedient was one of twenty-two Repeat s ordered by the British Admiralty in November 1914 as part of the Third War Construction Programme. The M-class was an improved version of the earlier  destroyers, required to reach a higher speed in order to counter rumoured German fast destroyers. It transpired that the German ships did not exist but the greater performance was appreciated by the navy. The Repeat M class differed from the prewar vessels in having a raked stem and design improvements based on wartime experience.

Displacement was  normal and  full load.

Armament consisted of three single single QF  Mk IV guns on the ship's centreline, with one on the forecastle, one aft on a raised platform and one between the middle and aft funnels. A single QF 2-pounder  "pom-pom" anti-aircraft gun was carried, while torpedo armament consisted of two twin mounts for  torpedoes. The ship had a complement of 80 officers and ratings.

Construction and career
Obedient was laid down by Scotts Shipbuilding and Engineering Company at their shipyard in Greenock with the yard number 464, launched on 6 November 1916 and completed in February the following year. The ship was the first of the name to serve with the navy. The vessel was deployed as part of the Grand Fleet, joining the Thirteenth Destroyer Flotilla.

On 30 May 1916, the destroyer sailed with the Grand Fleet to confront the German High Seas Fleet in what would be the Battle of Jutland. The division saw the approaching line of the German Third Torpedo Boat Flotilla and attacked. As the battle closed, the Flotilla spotted the retreating German line. The First Division was ordered to attack and use their superior speed to speed ahead of the German ships. Obedient launched two torpedoes at the battleships. A hit was claimed against the pre-dreadnought , but it is likely that both missed. Obedient and Marvel then attacked the German light cruisers, but withdrew without recording any hits,  

The destroyer was subsequently involved in anti-submarine patrols between 15 and 22 June the following year. During one of the patrols, Obedient was successful in driving away the submarine , but not before the merchant ship SS Buffalo, which had been heading for New York, had been attacked with torpedo and gunfire. Obedient attempted the take the stricken vessel in tow, but this was unsuccessful and the ship sank on 19 June. This was not untypical and the Admiralty redeployed the destroyers of the Grand Fleet from patrols to escorting convoy. By October, Obedient was one of eight travelling the North Sea with convoys to Norway.

After the armistice, the Grand Fleet was disbanded. The Royal Navy returned to a peacetime level of strength and both the number of ships and the amount of staff needed to be reduced to save money. On 21 October 1919, the destroyer was reduced and placed in reserve at Devonport. However, this did not last long as the harsh conditions of wartime service, particularly the combination of high speed and the poor weather that is typical of the North Sea, exacerbated by the fact that the hull was not galvanised, meant that the destroyer was worn out. After being decommissioned, Obedient was sold to Hayes on 25 November 1921 to be broken up in Porthcawl.

Pennant numbers

References

Citations

Bibliography

  
 
 
 
 
 
 
 
 
 
 
 
 
 
 
 
 
 

1916 ships
Admiralty M-class destroyers
Ships built on the River Clyde
World War I destroyers of the United Kingdom